Jesse Paine Wolcott (March 3, 1893 – January 28, 1969) was a politician and soldier from the U.S. state of Michigan.

Wolcott was born to William Bradford Wolcott and Lillie Betsy (Paine) Wolcott in Gardner, Massachusetts and attended the common and high schools there. After moving to Michigan, he attended the Detroit Technical Institute and graduated from the Detroit College of Law in 1915. He was admitted to the bar the same year and commenced practice in Detroit. In 1927, he married Grace Sullivan.

During the First World War, Wolcott served overseas as a second lieutenant in a machine gun company of the Twenty-sixth Infantry, First Division, from 1917 to 1919. After the war he settled in Port Huron and resumed the practice of law. He served as assistant police judge of Port Huron in 1921, assistant prosecuting attorney of St. Clair County from 1922 to 1926, and prosecuting attorney from 1927 to 1930.

In 1930, Wolcott defeated incumbent U.S. Representative Louis C. Cramton in the Republican Party primary elections. He went on to win the general election to be elected from Michigan's 7th congressional district to the 72nd United States Congress, and was subsequently re-elected to the twelve succeeding Congresses, serving from March 4, 1931 to January 3, 1957.  He was chairman of the Committee on Banking and Currency in the 80th and 83rd Congresses, and of the Joint Committee on Economic Report in the 83rd Congress. He was not a candidate for re-nomination in 1956.

In 1958, Jesse Wolcott was appointed a director of the Federal Deposit Insurance Corporation by U.S. President Dwight Eisenhower and served as chairman until January 1964.  He was a Universalist or Congregationalist and a member of American Legion, Veterans of Foreign Wars, Freemasons, Elks, Knights of Pythias, Lions, Moose, and Odd Fellows. He resided in Chevy Chase, Maryland until his death and is interred in Arlington National Cemetery.

References

Jesse P. Wolcott at The Political Graveyard

External links

1893 births
1969 deaths
Detroit College of Law alumni
People from Gardner, Massachusetts
Military personnel from Massachusetts
United States Army personnel of World War I
Burials at Arlington National Cemetery
Republican Party members of the United States House of Representatives from Michigan
20th-century American politicians
Chairs of the Federal Deposit Insurance Corporation
Eisenhower administration personnel